The men's sprint at the 1972 Summer Olympics in Munich, West Germany, was held on 1 to 2 September 1972. There were 51 entrants from 30 nations; 5 withdrawals left 46 competitors from 27 nations. Nations were limited to two cyclists each. The event was won by Daniel Morelon of France, successfully defending his 1968 title and becoming the first man to win three medals in the event (with his 1964 bronze). It was France's seventh gold medal in the event, most in the world. Silver went to John Nicholson of Australia, taking the nation's first medal in the men's sprint since 1956. Omar Pkhakadze, who had finished fourth in 1968, won the bronze this time for the Soviet Union's first medal in the event. Italy's six-Games medal streak was broken.

Background

This was the 15th appearance of the event, which has been held at every Summer Olympics except 1904 and 1912. Two quarterfinalists from 1968 returned: gold medalist (and 1964 bronze medalist) Daniel Morelon of France and fourth-place finisher Omar Pkhakadze of the Soviet Union. Morelon was heavily favored to repeat, with three world championships and two Grand Prix de Paris wins since his 1968 gold medal.

The Bahamas and Malaysia each made their debut in the men's sprint; East Germany competed separately for the first time. France made its 15th appearance, the only nation to have competed at every appearance of the event.

Competition format

This sprint competition involved a series of head-to-head matches. The 1972 competition involved ten rounds: six main rounds (first round, second round, 1/8 finals, quarterfinals, semifinals, and finals) as well as three repechages after the first three main rounds; the third repechage was a two-round repechage.

 First round: The 51 entrants were divided into 17 heats of 3 cyclists each. Withdrawals left some heats with only 2 competitors. The winner of each heat advanced directly to the second round (17 cyclists), while all other cyclists who competed were sent to the first repechage (29 cyclists).
 First repechage: The 29 cyclists were divided into 12 heats, each with 2 or 3 cyclists. The winner of each heat advanced to the second round (12 cyclists), while all others were eliminated (17 cyclists, including those who did not start).
 Second round: The 29 cyclists who advanced through the first round or first repechage were divided into 10 heats; all heats had 3 cyclists except heat 1, which had only 2. The winner of each heat advanced directly to the third round, the 1/8 finals (10 cyclists), while all others went to the second repechage (19 cyclists).
 Second repechage: The 19 cyclists from the second round were divided into 8 heats, with 2 or 3 cyclists per heat. Winners advanced to the 1/8 finals (8 cyclists), while all others were eliminated (11 cyclists).
 1/8 finals: The 18 cyclists who advanced through the first two rounds (including repechages) competed in a 1/8 finals round. There were 6 heats in this round, with 3 cyclists in each. The top cyclist in each heat advanced to the quarterfinals (6 cyclists), while the other 2 in each heat went to the third repechage (12 cyclists).
 Third repechage: This was a two-round repechage. The repechage began with 4 heats of 3 cyclists each. The top cyclist in each heat advanced to the second round, while the other 2 cyclists in each heat were eliminated. The second round of this repechage featured 2 heats of 2 cyclists each, with the winners advancing to the quarterfinals and the losers eliminated.
 Quarterfinals: Beginning with the quarterfinals, all matches were one-on-one competitions and were held in best-of-three format. There were 4 quarterfinals, with the winner of each advancing to the semifinals and the loser eliminated.
 Semifinals: The two semifinals provided for advancement to the gold medal final for winners and to the bronze medal final for losers.
 Finals: Both a gold medal final and a bronze medal final were held.

Records

The records for the sprint are 200 metre flying time trial records, kept for the qualifying round in later Games as well as for the finish of races.

No new world or Olympic records were set during the competition.

Schedule

All times are Central European Time (UTC+1)

Results

First round

First round heat 1

First round heat 2

First round heat 3

First round heat 4

First round heat 5

First round heat 6

First round heat 7

First round heat 8

First round heat 9

First round heat 10

First round heat 11

First round heat 12

First round heat 13

First round heat 14

First round heat 15

First round heat 16

First round heat 17

First repechage

First repechage heat 1

First repechage heat 2

First repechage heat 3

First repechage heat 4

First repechage heat 5

First repechage heat 6

First repechage heat 7

First repechage heat 8

First repechage heat 9

First repechage heat 10

First repechage heat 11

First repechage heat 12

Second round

Second round heat 1

Second round heat 2

Second round heat 3

Second round heat 4

Second round heat 5

Second round heat 6

Second round heat 7

Second round heat 8

Second round heat 9

Second round heat 10

Second repechage

Second repechage heat 1

Second repechage heat 2

Second repechage heat 3

Second repechage heat 4

Second repechage heat 5

Second repechage heat 6

Second repechage heat 7

Second repechage heat 8

1/8 finals

1/8 final 1

1/8 final 2

1/8 final 3

1/8 final 4

1/8 final 5

1/8 final 6

Third repechage heats

Third repechage heat 1

Third repechage heat 2

Third repechage heat 3

Third repechage heat 4

Third repechage finals

Third repechage final 1

Third repechage heat 2

Quarterfinals

Quarterfinal 1

Quarterfinal 2

Quarterfinal 3

Quarterfinal 4

Semifinals

Semifinal 1

Semifinal 2

Finals

Bronze medal match

Final

Final classification

References

Cycling at the 1972 Summer Olympics
Cycling at the Summer Olympics – Men's sprint
Track cycling at the 1972 Summer Olympics